In Greek mythology, an Oread (stem , , from) or Orestiad is a mountain nymph. Oreads differ from each other according to their dwelling: the Idaeae were from Mount Ida, Peliades from Mount Pelion, etc. Myths associated the Oreads with Artemis, since the goddess, when she went out hunting, preferred mountains and rocky precipices.

The generic term "oread" itself appears to be  Hellenistic (first attested in the Epitaph of Adonis of Bion of Smyrna) and thus  post-Classical.

List of Oreads
The number of Oreads includes but is not limited to:

Honours
 Oread Institute, a former women's college in Worcester, Massachusetts
 Mount Oread in Lawrence, Kansas, named after the institute by settlers from Worcester
 Oread Lake in Antarctica

Notes

References 

 Antoninus Liberalis, The Metamorphoses of Antoninus Liberalis translated by Francis Celoria (Routledge 1992). Online version at the Topos Text Project.

 Apollodorus, The Library with an English Translation by Sir James George Frazer, F.B.A., F.R.S. in 2 Volumes, Cambridge, MA, Harvard University Press; London, William Heinemann Ltd. 1921. ISBN 0-674-99135-4. Online version at the Perseus Digital Library. Greek text available from the same website.

 Aristophanes, Thesmophoriazusae in The Complete Greek Drama, vol. 2. Eugene O'Neill, Jr. New York. Random House. 1938. Online version at the Perseus Digital Library.

 Britannica, The Editors of Encyclopaedia, "Echo." Encyclopedia Britannica.  Accessed 18 May 2022.
 Diodorus Siculus, The Library of History translated by Charles Henry Oldfather. Twelve volumes. Loeb Classical Library. Cambridge, Massachusetts: Harvard University Press; London: William Heinemann, Ltd. 1989. Vol. 3. Books 4.59–8. Online version at Bill Thayer's Web Site
 Diodorus Siculus, Bibliotheca Historica. Vol 1-2. Immanel Bekker. Ludwig Dindorf. Friedrich Vogel. in aedibus B. G. Teubneri. Leipzig. 1888-1890. Greek text available at the Perseus Digital Library.
 Gaius Julius Hyginus, Astronomica from The Myths of Hyginus translated and edited by Mary Grant. University of Kansas Publications in Humanistic Studies. Online version at the Topos Text Project.
 Liddell, Henry George, Robert Scott, A Greek-English Lexicon, revised and augmented throughout by Sir Henry Stuart Jones with the assistance of Roderick McKenzie, Clarendon Press Oxford, 1940. Online version at the Perseus Digital Library.
 Maurus Servius Honoratus, In Vergilii carmina comentarii. Servii Grammatici qui feruntur in Vergilii carmina commentarii; recensuerunt Georgius Thilo et Hermannus Hagen. Georgius Thilo. Leipzig. B. G. Teubner. 1881. Online version at the Perseus Digital Library.
 Pausanias, Description of Greece with an English Translation by W.H.S. Jones, Litt.D., and H.A. Ormerod, M.A., in 4 Volumes. Cambridge, MA, Harvard University Press; London, William Heinemann Ltd. 1918. . Online version at the Perseus Digital Library
 Pausanias, Graeciae Descriptio. 3 vols. Leipzig, Teubner. 1903.  Greek text available at the Perseus Digital Library.
Plutarch. Lives, Volume II: Themistocles and Camillus. Aristides and Cato Major. Cimon and Lucullus. Translated by Bernadotte Perrin. Loeb Classical Library No. 47. Cambridge, Massachusetts: Harvard University Press, 1914. . Online version at Harvard University Press. Aristides at the Perseus Digital Library.
 Propertius, Elegies Edited and translated by G. P. Goold. Loeb Classical Library 18. Cambridge, Massachusetts: Harvard University Press, 1990.  Online version at Harvard University Press.

 
Nymphs
Mountain goddesses
Greek legendary creatures